Camden Power Station in Mpumalanga, South Africa, is a coal-fired power plant operated by Eskom.

History
Camden was commissioned in 1967. Between 1990 and 2006 the station was mothballed, but South Africa's energy crisis in the early 21st century prompted Eskom to recommission the station, starting with unit 6 in July 2005 and completing with unit 1 in July 2008.

Power generation
Power is generated by eight 200 MW units with a total installed capacity on 1,600 MW.  Coal energy to electrical energy conversion efficiency is 33.40%

In the Integrated results for 2015, nominal capacity is listed as 1,481 MW with gross capacity of 1,561 MW (3 x 200 MW; 1 x 196 MW; 2 x 195 MW; 1 x 190 MW; 1 x 185 MW).

The four chimneys of Camden Power Station are 152.4 metres (500 ft) tall.

Power distribution
In addition to feeding the South African grid, Camden, along with Arnot Power Station, also feeds the Mozal Aluminium smelter in Mozambique via 400 kV transmission lines. Mozal consumes around 950 MW.

Crime
In November 2022, Eskom reported multiple arrests at Camden Power Station, which were linked to sabotage, coal theft and coal fraud. A contractor, intending to land additional maintenance and repair jobs, intentionally drained oil from an oil burner bearing which caused the burners to trip repeatedly. Truck drivers were also arrested for their possession of substandard (coal mixed with worthless material) or stolen coal which was to be delivered to Eskom. 

Mid-December 2022, at the request of the Minister of Public Enterprises, Pravin Gordhan, and President Cyril Ramaphosa, Minister of Defence Thandi Modise deployed a small contingent of SANDF troops at the station (besides Majuba, Grootvlei and Tutuka) due to a growing threat of sabotage, theft, vandalism and corruption.

See also 

 Eskom
 Fossil-fuel power plant
 List of power stations in South Africa

External links 
 Camden Power Station on the Eskom-Website

References

Coal-fired power stations in South Africa
Buildings and structures in Mpumalanga
Economy of Mpumalanga